Duas Barras is a municipality located in the Brazilian state of Rio de Janeiro. Its population was 11,528 (2020) and its area is 375.238 km².
The town has a historic centre with colourful painted homes around its main square.

References

Municipalities in Rio de Janeiro (state)